Heinrich Reinhardt (1865–1922) was an Austrian composer. He died on 31 January 1922 in Vienna and is buried at the Döbling Cemetery.

Biography
Reinhardt was born on 13 April 1865 in Pressburg (now Bratislava). The son of a jeweller, he went to Vienna to study at the conservatory of the Gesellschaft der Musikfreunde where he was one of Anton Bruckner's pupils. He became an accomplished pianist and organist, and his familiarity with several other instruments later served him well as orchestrator of his own works and those of others. Between 1890 and 1900 he published numerous songs, piano and salon pieces, as well as an opera, Die Minnekönigin (1895).

He also wrote music reports for the Neue Freie Presse, Neues Wiener Journal and Die Zeit, but abandoned this after the tremendous success of his first operetta, Das süsse Mädel (Carltheater, 25 October 1901). It opened a new phase for Viennese operetta, being more overtly in the song and dance musical comedy style. However, Reinhardt's dozen later works were eclipsed by those of Edmund Eysler, Franz Lehár, Oscar Straus and Leo Fall.

Compositions

Operas
 Die Minnekönigin (1895) 
 Der Söldner (1922)

Operettas
 Das süsse Mädel (1901) 
 Der liebe Schatz (1902) 
 Der General-Konsul (1904) 
 Krieg im Frieden (1906) 
 Die süssen Grisetten (1907) 
 Ein Märchen für alles (1908) 
 Die Sprudelfee (1909) 
 Die siamesischen Zwillinge (1909) 
 Studentenhochzeit (1910) 
 Miss Exzentrik (1910) 
 Napoleon und die Frauen (1911) 
 Prinzessin Gretl (1914) 
 Die erste Frau (1915) 
 Der Gast der Königs (1916) 
 Der Glückstrompeter (1922)
 Grisettenliebe (1928)
 Der Schuster von Delft (?)

Sources

Andrew Lamb: "Heinrich Reinhardt", Grove Music Online ed. L. Macy (Accessed 20 September 2008), (subscription access)

External links

Austrian classical composers
Austrian opera composers
Male opera composers
1865 births
1922 deaths
Austrian male classical composers
19th-century classical composers
19th-century Austrian musicians
19th-century Austrian male musicians
20th-century classical composers
20th-century Austrian composers
20th-century Austrian male musicians
Musicians from Bratislava